Crawford Kilian (born February 7, 1941) is a Canadian novelist and a college professor. He is also the former public education columnist for the Vancouver Province newspaper. Kilian holds an undergraduate degree from Columbia University and master's degree from Simon Fraser University.

Biography

Born in New York City, Crawford Kilian grew up in Los Angeles and Mexico City. He graduated from Santa Monica High School in 1958 and moved back to New York to attend college. Kilian completed his undergraduate career at Columbia University in 1962.

After graduation, Kilian was drafted into the United States Army where he completed a two-year tour of duty. After his tour of duty, he became a technical writer for the Lawrence Radiation Laboratory in Berkeley, California.

Shortly after he moved to Vancouver, Canada, where he began his education career. Kilian taught in two British Columbia community colleges between 1967 and 2008, of which five months were spent in China from 1983 to 1984. Kilian's first teaching position was at the Vancouver post-secondary institution, Vancouver Community College. Shortly after in 1968, he moved to Capilano College for its inaugural year.  After 40 years at Capilano, he retired in the spring of 2008.

Kilian has published hundreds of articles on a wide range of topics including education, science, environment, politics, webwriting, and books. After retirement he became a part-time writer-editor for The Tyee, an online newspaper based in Vancouver.

He currently lives in North Vancouver, British Columbia.

Selected works

References

External links
 Writing for the Web blog by Kilian
 H5N1 Blog by Kilian
 Writing Fiction blog by Kilian
 
 

1941 births
Living people
Canadian fantasy writers
Simon Fraser University alumni
Academic staff of Capilano University
Canadian male novelists
Columbia College (New York) alumni